Samuel or Sam Shepard or Sheppard may refer to:

Samuel Sheppard (writer) (–), English author and poet
Sam Sheppard (1923–1970), American physician who inspired The Fugitive
Sam Shepard (1943–2017), American actor and playwright
 Samuel Shephard (1987–), recipient of the George Cross
Sam Shephard, candidate in the 1990 Ontario general election
Sam Shepard, a character in the novel Overkill

See also
Sam Shepherd (disambiguation)